This is a list of The Smurfs video games that have been published by developers such as Coleco, Infogrames, and Capcom. The Smurfs (Les Schtroumpfs) are a fictional group of small sky blue creatures who live in a village in the woods. They were designed by Belgian cartoonist Peyo in 1958 and were featured in the Belgian comics magazine Spirou. They are widely known through the 1980s Hanna-Barbera animated television series of the same name.

As a franchise, the Smurfs appeared in many video games throughout the 1980s and 1990s on many consoles. They have been released for the Nintendo Entertainment System, the Super Nintendo Entertainment System, the Game Boy line, the early Atari consoles, Coleco's ColecoVision, most of Sega's consoles, the PlayStation, the PC, iOS, Android, Nintendo DS, Wii, and Nintendo 3DS.

List

References

Lists of video games by franchise